Browett is a surname. Notable people with the surname include:

 George Browett (1929–1994), British trade union leader
 John Browett (born 1963), British businessman

See also
 Browett, Lindley & Co, manufacturer
 Rowett